Egidio Feruglio (6 January 1921 – 2 July 1981) was an Italian racing cyclist. He rode in the 1947 and 1948 Tour de France.

References

External links
 

1921 births
1981 deaths
Italian male cyclists
Cyclists from Friuli Venezia Giulia
People from the Province of Udine